Curaçao is a liqueur flavored with the dried peel of the bitter orange laraha, a citrus fruit grown on the Dutch island of Curaçao.

Curaçao can be sold in numerous forms, though the most common are the orange-hued dry Curaçao and blue Curaçao, which is dyed bright blue.

History
It is unknown who developed the first Curaçao liqueur and when. The Dutch West Indies Company took possession of Curaçao in 1634. The Bols distillery, founded in 1575 in Amsterdam, had shares in both the West and East India Companies to guarantee the access to spices required for their distilled drinks. According to the early nineteenth-century French culinary chronicler Alexandre Grimod de la Reynière, curaçao originated in Flanders, and proximity to the province of Holland gave distillers easy access to the necessary peels (since Curaçao was a Dutch colony at the time). 

Curaçao liqueur is traditionally made with the dried peels of the laraha (Citrus × aurantium subsp. currassuviencis), a bitter orange that developed on Curaçao. Spanish explorers brought the progenitor of the laraha, the bitter Seville orange, to the island in 1527. Although the bitter flesh of the laraha is unpalatable, the peels are pleasantly aromatic.

The Bols company maintains that Lucas Bols (1652–1719) developed a laraha-based liqueur after the discovery that an aromatic oil could be extracted from the unripe peel of the otherwise useless bitter oranges. Bols then had this oil exported back to Amsterdam to produce a liqueur similar to current day Curaçao. Lucas Bols tended to add an "element of alchemical mystery" to his products, explaining the unlikely addition of a blue coloring. In 1912 Bols sold blue curaçao as Crème de Ciel ("cream of the sky"), most likely a reference to the 1907 musical Miss Hook of Holland.

Senior & Co, a company started in Curaçao, is the only company that has always produced its liqueur from the peels of the laraha from Curaçao. The family, Senior and Chumaceiro, started selling their liqueur in 1896 in their pharmacy in small quantities. In 1947 they bought the Landhuis (Dutch for "country manor") Chobolobo in Willemstad, where the distillery has since been housed. As this company is the only one that uses native laraha fruit, it includes the word "genuine" on its labels.

The liqueur is mentioned in Charles Dickens' novel Our Mutual Friend of 1864–65 under the spelling "Curaçoa", which was common at the time.

Preparation

To create the liqueur, Senior and Co soak the laraha in alcohol and water for several days, after which the peel is removed, and placed in a gunny bag. Spices are added and the bag is hung in a heated 120 year old copper still with 96% pure and kosher alcohol (derived from sugar cane) for three days. After one day cooling, water is added and distillation takes place for another three days. The liqueur has an orange-like flavor with varying degrees of bitterness. It is naturally colorless but is often given artificial coloring, most commonly blue or orange, which confers an exotic appearance to cocktails and other mixed drinks. The blue color is achieved by adding a food colorant, most often E133 brilliant blue.

Some other liqueurs are also sold as Curaçaos with different flavors added, such as coffee, chocolate, rum and raisin.

See also 
 List of liqueurs
 Triple sec

References 

Curaçao culture
Orange liqueurs
Dutch liqueurs